Lady May may refer to:
Theresa May, Lady May (born 1956), British politician and former prime minister
Lady May (rapper) (born 1974), rapper, singer, songwriter and model from Long Island
Lady May (Namibian singer) (born 1986), singer from Namibia
"Lady May", song by Glim Spanky